"Get You" is a song by Canadian singer and songwriter Daniel Caesar, featuring Colombian-American singer and songwriter Kali Uchis. It was released on October 20, 2016, as the lead single from Caesar's debut studio album, Freudian (2017), with the b-side, "Japanese Denim". "Get You" was written by Caesar and Uchis, with production of both tracks handled by Jordan Evans and Matthew Burnett in collaboration with BadBadNotGood.

"Get You" was nominated for Best R&B Performance at the 60th Annual Grammy Awards.

Background
In an interview with Billboard, Caesar said: "I met a girl and got very involved. She brought things and feelings out of me that I didn't know I had. 'Get You' is a song of praise to a love I didn't even feel I deserved at the time. Being with someone you truly adore and being present enough in the moment that the world literally slows down and you ask yourself how did I stumble into this? I'm always shooting myself in the foot, but I'm in here." Talking about his collaborator on the song, Kali Uchis, he said: "Kali is great and very sweet. There's no ego between us so it makes for great chemistry. We have very different backgrounds and have different world views and I think we perceive music differently because of that, but it blends well. It's lots of fun to work with Kali. We've only just started." Reflecting on the song, he told Essence: "I'm absent minded and daydream a lot. It just felt like the song was already there and I was just lucky enough to find it."

Release and reception 
"Get You" was released via Caesar's Golden Child Recordings on October 20, 2016, as the lead single from Caesar's debut studio album, Freudian (2017). It premiered on Billboard magazine and Beats 1.

Caesar played an acoustic version of it in a trailer of this documentary on Apple Music. A music video for the song was released on December 1, 2016. The song was nominated for Best R&B Performance at the 60th Annual Grammy Awards.

On August 16, 2017, Caesar made his late-night television debut by performing "Get You" live on The Late Late Show with James Corden, backed by a band and eight background vocalists. He also performed "We Find Love" alongside, as part of Apple Music's "Up Next" segment. Zane Lowe, who presented Caesar along with James Corden, said of the performance, "It's been amazing to witness Daniel Caesar's journey up to this point. He has one of the most exciting and tasteful voices in modern music."

At the time of its release, both the commercial and promotional version of the single of were backed by "Japanese Denim". The track was a sleeper hit, gaining popularity despite not appearing on Freudian; in February 2021, it was simultaneously certified by RIAA as a gold and platinum record.

In early 2023, the song was sent to rhythmic contemporary stations, reaching the top 100 of the radio charts in US.

Track listing

Personnel
Credits adapted from "Get You"/"Japanese Denim" radio sampler credits and YouTube.
 Daniel Caesar – songwriting
Kali Uchis – additional vocals, songwriting ("Get You")
Jordan Evans – production, engineering; drum programming, mixing ("Get You")
 Matthew Burnett – production, keys
BADBADNOTGOOD – music; production ("Japanese Denim")
Chester Hansen – keys; bass ("Japanese Denim")
Alexander Sowinski – drums, drum programming
Matthew Tavares – engineering; mixing, additional production ("Get You")
Ian Culley – guitars
Wes Allen – bass ("Get You")
Riley Bell – mixing, mastering

Charts

Certifications
"Get You"

"Japanese Denim"

References

2016 singles
2016 songs
Daniel Caesar songs
Kali Uchis songs
Songs written by Daniel Caesar
Male–female vocal duets
Songs written by Kali Uchis